NGC 4618 is a distorted barred dwarf galaxy in the constellation Canes Venatici.  The galaxy is formally classified as a Sm galaxy, which means that its structure vaguely resembles the structure of spiral galaxies.  The galaxy is sometimes referred to as a Magellanic spiral because of its resemblance to the Magellanic clouds.

Structure

Unlike most spiral galaxies, NGC 4618 has a single spiral arm, which gives the galaxy an asymmetric appearance.  This galaxy was included in the Atlas of Peculiar Galaxies as one of three examples of nearby galaxies with single spiral arms. Although NGC 4618 is labeled as peculiar, many similar galaxies have been identified.

It has been hypothesized that this galaxy's asymmetric structure may be the result of a gravitational interaction with NGC 4625.  Such asymmetric structure is commonly seen among many interacting galaxies.  However, observations of neutral hydrogen gas in NGC 4618 and NGC 4625 imply that only some of the gas outside the optical disks of NGC 4618 is affected by the gravitational interaction.  This may indicate that NGC 4618's one-arm shape forms as the result of processes that are intrinsic to the galaxy itself.

Environment

As mentioned above, NGC 4618 is interacting with NGC 4625.

See also
 Canes II Group
 NGC 5713 - a similar asymmetric spiral galaxy

References

External links
 

Barred spiral galaxies
Interacting galaxies
4618
IC objects
07853
42575
023
Canes II Group
Canes Venatici